Kittery Point is a census-designated place (CDP) in the town of Kittery, York County, Maine, United States. First settled in 1623, Kittery Point traces its history to the first seafarers who colonized the shore of what became Massachusetts Bay Colony and later the State of Maine.  Located beside the Atlantic Ocean, it is home to Fort McClary State Historic Site, and Fort Foster Park on Gerrish Island. Cutts Island is home to Seapoint Beach and the Brave Boat Harbor Division of the Rachel Carson National Wildlife Refuge.

Kittery Point is part of the Portland–South Portland–Biddeford, Maine Metropolitan Statistical Area. The population was 1,012 at the 2010 census.

History
Settled as early as 1623, the southern part of Kittery was once called Champernowne's after Sir Francis Champernowne, a prominent merchant adventurer and cousin of Sir Ferdinando Gorges, the prime mover behind settlement north of the Massachusetts Bay Colony. Nicholas Shapleigh built the first house in the area, and Edward Godfrey established a trading post in 1632. Early professions included fishermen, hunters and trappers. Others harvested the region's abundant timber, which was shipped to England or the West Indies. The town of Kittery was incorporated in 1652 when Maine became part of the Massachusetts Bay Colony.

The Pepperrells were a distinguished Kittery Point family who established fisheries to supply the London market. William Pepperrell Sr. had arrived from Devonshire as a lowly fisherman's apprentice at the Isles of Shoals in New Hampshire. He went on to build a mercantile empire, which his son Sir William Pepperrell inherited and expanded. Sir William became the first baronet in New England for commanding a militia which defeated the French in 1745 at the Siege of Louisbourg. His gambrel mansion of 1733 remains a landmark at Pepperrell Cove on the Piscataqua River. In 1760, his widow built the Lady Pepperrell House, a noted Georgian building formerly owned by Historic New England.

Pepperrell himself built an elaborate wooden house called the Sparhawk Mansion at Kittery Point as a gift to his daughter on her marriage to Nathaniel Sparhawk in 1750. Crowned with an elegant cupola, the house contained finely carved panelling in its 19 rooms. Sadly, over two centuries later, in 1967 the Sparhawk Mansion was demolished, just as preservation efforts in the area were emerging. More fortunate is the John Bray House, built by a shipwright in 1662 and considered the oldest surviving house in Maine. Recently threatened with redevelopment because of its desirable view of Pepperrell Cove and Portsmouth Harbor, the building has instead been restored. Some speculate that the Bray House was the birthplace of the mother of Sir William Pepperrell, whose father William Pepperrell Sr. married John Bray's daughter Margery, but it is more likely that she was born in England.

On land once owned by Sir William Pepperrell is a Portsmouth Harbor defense called Fort McClary, built opposite Fort Constitution in New Castle, New Hampshire. It is today Fort McClary State Historic Site and features a blockhouse dating from 1844. In 1969, it was listed on the National Register of Historic Places. Now owned by the town of Kittery, Fort Foster Park provides superb views of Portsmouth Harbor, Whaleback Lighthouse and the Isles of Shoals, part of which belongs to Kittery. Near Seapoint Beach in the mid-20th century, the Newcomen Society built a cluster of Tudor cottages at what was then its summer retreat.

Geography
Kittery Point is bounded by Spruce Creek, the Piscataqua River, the Atlantic Ocean and Brave Boat Harbor.

Demographics

As of the census of 2000, there were 1,135 people, 538 households, and 322 families residing in the CDP. The population density was 230.6/km2 (596.9/mi2). There were 594 housing units at an average density of 120.7/km2 (312.4/mi2). The racial makeup of the CDP was 97.44% White, 0.97% African American, 0.18% Native American, 0.53% Asian, 0.09% from other races, and 0.79% from two or more races. Hispanic or Latino of any race were 0.53% of the population.

There were 538 households, out of which 19.5% had children under the age of 18 living with them, 50.4% were married couples living together, 6.5% had a female householder with no husband present, and 40.0% were non-families. 31.4% of all households were made up of individuals, and 12.1% had someone living alone who was 65 years of age or older. The average household size was 2.11 and the average family size was 2.64.

In the CDP, the population was spread out, with 16.3% under the age of 18, 3.4% from 18 to 24, 27.5% from 25 to 44, 32.5% from 45 to 64, and 20.3% who were 65 years of age or older. The median age was 46 years. For every 100 females, there were 91.4 males. For every 100 females age 18 and over, there were 88.9 males.

The median income for a household in the CDP was $47,500, and the median income for a family was $53,839. Males had a median income of $40,417 versus $29,808 for females. The per capita income for the CDP was $30,119. About 4.7% of families and 5.8% of the population were below the poverty line, including 13.0% of those under age 18 and 4.4% of those age 65 or over.

Arts and culture

Sites of interest
 Foster Park
 Fort McClary State Historic Site
 Kittery Art Association
 Kittery Historical and Naval Museum
 Rachel Carson National Wildlife Refuge
 Spruce Creek

Notable people
 John Haley Bellamy, woodcarver and folk artist
 Sir William Pepperrell, merchant and soldier
 Celia Thaxter, poet and writer
 John Treworgie, trading post agent and politician
 Helen Magill White, first American female Ph.D

Gallery

In popular culture 
DinoSquad  is an American animated television series that was produced by DIC Entertainment (Now DHX Media) and aired on the KEWLopolis block on CBS from November 3, 2007 - September 12, 2009. Dino Squad is set in Kittery Point, Maine.

References

External links 

 Town of Kittery, Maine

Census-designated places in Maine
Census-designated places in York County, Maine
Portland metropolitan area, Maine
Populated coastal places in Maine
Kittery, Maine